Luis Miguel Gil (born November 14, 1993) is an American professional soccer player who plays for Union Omaha in the USL League One.

Youth
The son of Mexican immigrants, Luis Gil grew up in Garden Grove, California, where he started playing at the age of three.
Gil attended U.S. Soccer Development Academy member IMG Soccer Academy in Bradenton, Florida in 2008 as a youth player.

Career

Club
Gil turned professional when he signed a Generation Adidas contract with Major League Soccer in February 2010, spurning interest from major European clubs such as Premier League side Arsenal.

Having signed a GA deal after the MLS draft, Gil was placed in a weighted lottery to allocate him to an MLS club. The Kansas City Wizards won the rights to Gil despite the player having stated his preference before the lottery to play for a western-based club. MLS helped engineer Gil's trade to Real Salt Lake in exchange for an international roster slot, a second-round pick in the 2011 MLS SuperDraft, and 25 percent of any future transfer fee should RSL sell Gil outside of MLS. Gil made his professional debut as a substitute against D.C. United in the 2010 US Open Cup.

During the latter half of 2010, Gil joined AC St. Louis of the USSF Division 2 Professional League on loan. He made his debut for St. Louis on August 20 as a late substitute against the Puerto Rico Islanders, and scored his first professional goal on September 18, a 93rd-minute winner against the Austin Aztex.

On October 19, 2010, Gil made his RSL debut in a CONCACAF Champions League group match against Cruz Azul. He started the game and chipped a ball into the box to a teammate who was taken down for a penalty.

He made his MLS debut on March 26, 2011, coming on as a second-half substitute in RSL's 4–1 home win against Los Angeles Galaxy. He scored his first MLS goal on August 6, 2011, against New York Red Bulls.

In December 2015, Gil signed with Querétaro of Liga MX.

With playing time in Mexico limited, Gil was loaned to Orlando City for the 2017 season. His loan continued after an August trade to the Colorado Rapids.

On April 23, 2018, Gil again returned to MLS when he joined Houston Dynamo on loan. Gil made an appearance with the Dynamo USL affiliate, the Rio Grande Valley FC Toros, before making his Dynamo debut on May 11 in a 2-2 draw with the Vancouver Whitecaps. He helped the Dynamo win the 2018 US Open Cup, making 3 appearances and getting 1 assist in the tournament.

In July 2019, Gil signed a one-year deal with Czech National Football League side Viktoria Žižkov.

In March 2021, Gil signed a deal with Czech National Football League side FC MAS Táborsko.

Gil joined USL League One side Union Omaha on July 22, 2022.

International
Gil was born in the United States and is of Mexican descent. In 2009, Gil was a member of the United States U-17 national team for both the CONCACAF U-17 Championships and the FIFA U-17 World Cup.

Gil was named to the United States U-18 roster for the 2011 Milk Cup tournament in Northern Ireland.

Gil was included in the United States U-20 squad for the 2013 FIFA U-20 World Cup in Turkey, and scored a "spectacular" goal in a losing cause against Spain: "twisting and turning to work some space for himself  from goal, [he] provided an early candidate for goal of the tournament with a stunning left-foot shot into the top right-hand corner."

He made his first appearance with the senior team on February 1, 2014 in a friendly against South Korea.

Statistics

Honors
Querétaro
 Copa MX: Apertura 2016

Houston Dynamo
 US Open Cup: 2018

References

External links

 

1993 births
Living people
American soccer players
American expatriate soccer players
American sportspeople of Mexican descent
Real Salt Lake players
AC St. Louis players
Querétaro F.C. footballers
Orlando City SC players
Colorado Rapids players
Houston Dynamo FC players
Rio Grande Valley FC Toros players
FK Viktoria Žižkov players
FC Silon Táborsko players
USSF Division 2 Professional League players
Major League Soccer players
Liga MX players
USL Championship players
Soccer players from California
United States men's youth international soccer players
United States men's under-20 international soccer players
United States men's under-23 international soccer players
United States men's international soccer players
People from Garden Grove, California
Expatriate footballers in Mexico
Expatriate footballers in the Czech Republic
Association football midfielders
American expatriate sportspeople in Mexico
American expatriate sportspeople in the Czech Republic
Czech National Football League players
Union Omaha players
National Independent Soccer Association players
USL League One players